Glass Animals are an English indie rock band formed in Oxford in 2010. Founded and led by singer, songwriter, and producer Dave Bayley, the group also features his childhood friends Joe Seaward, Ed Irwin-Singer and Drew MacFarlane. Bayley wrote and produced all three Glass Animals albums. Bayley spent his childhood in Massachusetts and Texas before relocating to Oxford, where he met the other band members at school. Their first album, Zaba (2014), spawned the single "Gooey", which was eventually certified platinum in the United States. Their second full album, How to Be a Human Being, received positive reviews and won in two categories at the 2018 MPG Awards for UK Album of the Year and Self Producing Artist of the Year, as well as a spot on the Mercury Prize shortlist. The third, Dreamland, peaked at number two on the UK Albums Chart and number seven on the US Billboard 200.

The band is best known for their biggest hit single "Heat Waves", which went viral on social media platform TikTok. It reached number one in Australia in February 2021 and was voted number one on the Triple J Hottest 100 of 2020. The song surpassed two billion streams on Spotify by September 2022, and eventually reached number one on the US Billboard Hot 100 and number five on the UK Singles Chart. At the 2022 Brit Awards, the band were nominated for two Brit Awards (Best British Rock Act and "Heat Waves" for Best British Single). They received their first Grammy nomination in the Best New Artist category at the 2022 Grammy Awards.

History 
All four member of the band are British and met at St Edward's School, Oxford. Bayley was raised in the US where his father worked, and returned to the UK when he was aged 13. On arrival at St Edwards, where he had a music scholarship, he was introduced to MacFarlane who had also grown up in the US, and who in turn introduced him to Irwin-Singer and Seaward.

2012–2015: Zaba and various EPs  

On 28 May 2012, the band released their debut EP, Leaflings, which included the single "Cocoa Hooves". The EP was released on independent label Kaya Kaya Records, a subsidiary and imprint of XL Recordings (part of the Beggars Group of labels). 

In 2013, the band released Black Mambo / Exxus EP in Europe, and Glass Animals EP in the US. The Glass Animals EP also saw the band collaborating with Jean Deaux, a soulful hip-hop teenager from Chicago, on a song titled "Woozy".

In 2014, the band made their first visit to the US, performing at South by Southwest in Austin, Texas. They released three more singles: "Pools", "Gooey", and "Hazey", along with a collaboration with Argentine singer-songwriter and producer Tei Shi.

All five singles were included on the band's debut album, Zaba, which was released on 6 June 2014. The band performed the single "Gooey" on Late Night with Seth Meyers in 2014, and again on The Late Show with David Letterman on 24 February 2015, and toured extensively after Zaba, visiting both hemispheres and played over 130 shows in 2015 alone. Their October 2015 US tour included two sold-out shows at The Wiltern in LA and sold-out shows across America including T5 in NYC, The Riverside in Milwaukee, and the Midland Theatre in Kansas City.

A collaboration with American rapper Joey Bada$$, titled "Lose Control", was released on 6 October 2015.

2016–2019: How to Be a Human Being 

On 16 May 2016, the band released the lead single, "Life Itself", from their second album How to Be a Human Being. "Life Itself" peaked at number 14 on Billboards Alternative Songs chart and spent 26 weeks on Sirius XM's Alt-18 chart, peaking at number one. A music video for the song was released on 7 June 2016. The band also created a website based on the character from "Life Itself".

On 25 July, a second single from the album, "Youth", was released along with its music video. This song was also used as a soundtrack in the popular football video game by EA Sports, FIFA 17. Four days before the release of the album, on 22 August, the band released a third single, "Season 2 Episode 3", about a girl who "spends her entire time watching TV, lounging around, not doing anything, being high, eating mayonnaise from a jar".

The full album How to Be a Human Being was released on 26 August 2016 by Wolf Tone and Caroline International in Europe, and Harvest Records in the United States. It was inspired by stories of strangers that Bayley met on tour, with each song telling a different story from a different perspective.

In July 2018, drummer Joe Seaward was seriously injured when he was hit by a lorry while cycling in Dublin. Seaward's accident and recovery resulted in the band cancelling their remaining tour dates for rest of the year.

2019–present: Dreamland
After touring for How to Be a Human Being, the band released two singles; "Tokyo Drifting", a duet with Denzel Curry, on 14 November 2019, and  "Your Love (Déjà Vu)" on 19 February 2020. On 1 May 2020, the band released a single named "Dreamland", and announced an album of the same name to be released on 10 July 2020. The beginnings of Dreamland originated after drummer Joe Seaward's bike accident in Dublin. While spending long hours by Seaward's side in the hospital as he recovered, Bayley started "writing down memories and searching for more memories." Those memories eventually evolved into the nostalgic and very personal Dreamland album full of references to Bayley's childhood and other points in his life.

On 28 June, the band announced that the album had been delayed, to "keep focus on the Black Lives Matter movement and the discussions taking place around racism and police brutality around the world." In the lead-up to Dreamland, Glass Animals launched an open-source website where fans could access and download song samples, artwork, and other content related to the album. Dreamland was released on 7 August 2020 via Polydor Records. In an interview with Atwood Magazine, Bayley explained: "I guess the goal with this record was to make something that was incredibly honest and incredibly us." The album entered the UK Albums Chart at number two. "Heat Waves" was included on the FIFA 21 soundtrack.

On 23 January 2021, "Heat Waves" placed first on the Triple J Hottest 100 of 2020 in Australia, with "Tangerine" placing at 18th and "Your Love (Déjà Vu)" at 51st. The following month, "Heat Waves" reached number one on the ARIA Singles Chart. In April 2021, "Tokyo Drifting" was featured in a television commercial released by Peloton as part of their Champions Collection campaign.

A bonus track and single, "I Don’t Wanna Talk (I Just Wanna Dance)", was included on the FIFA 22 soundtrack. After a record-breaking 59-week climb on the US Billboard Hot 100, "Heat Waves" topped the chart for the week ending 12 March 2022.

Musical style
Glass Animals' musical style has been described as indie rock, psychedelic pop, indie pop, electronic rock, and alternative pop.

Band members 
Dave Bayley (full name: David Algernon Bayley) – lead vocals, guitar, keyboards, drums, tambourine, songwriting duties
Drew MacFarlane – guitar, keyboards, backing vocals
Edmund Irwin-Singer – bass guitar, keyboards, backing vocals
Joe Seaward – drums, percussion

Discography

Studio albums

Remix albums

Extended plays

Singles

Promotional singles

Other charted songs

Awards and nominations

Notes

References

External links

 Official home page
 Facebook page
 Billboard: Glass Animals Choose Music Over Med School
 Pitch: Glass Animals' Frontman Dave Bayley Talks Disney Princess, 2015 Goals Ahead of Saturday's Sold-out Midlands Show 

2012 establishments in the United Kingdom
Caroline Records artists
Harvest Records artists
English indie rock groups
Musical groups from Oxford
Musical groups established in 2012
Polydor Records artists
Republic Records artists
Trip hop groups